Pierre Lescure (born 2 July 1945) is a French journalist and television executive. He is known for having founded the French TV music show Les Enfants du rock broadcast on public television from 1981 to 1988 and for having led the French Canal+ channel from its creation in 1984 to 2002. Since 2015 he has been the president of the Cannes Film Festival.

Biography 
He grew up in Choisy-le-Roi. He studied journalism at the Centre de formation des journalistes de Paris.

He started his career at the radio station RTL, where he was reporter and news anchor from 1965 to 1968, and moved to RMC from 1968 to 1972.

He started working in television as a news anchor of the evening news program of the French public network Antenne 2. In 1981, he created the TV music show .

He supported the candidacy of François Hollande during the 2012 French presidential election, and has led a mission about Culture and Media in his government.

He became president of the Cannes Film Festival in 2014.

Filmography
 2008 : Musée haut, musée bas, directed by Jean-Michel Ribes

References 

1945 births
Living people
Journalists from Paris
French television executives
Groupe Canal+
Mass media people from Paris
International Emmy Founders Award winners
French male non-fiction writers